The Ambassador of the United Kingdom to Kuwait is the United Kingdom's foremost diplomatic representative in the State of Kuwait, and head of the UK's diplomatic mission in Kuwait.  The official title is His Britannic Majesty's Ambassador to the State of Kuwait.

The Sheikhdom of Kuwait became a British protectorate in 1899 after an agreement was signed between Sheikh Mubarak Al-Sabah and the British government in India, due to severe threats to Kuwait's independence from the Ottoman Empire. The British government was represented by Political Agents who were appointed by the Indian Political Service until 1948, then by the Foreign Office. In 1961 Kuwait became independent and the last political agent, John Richmond, became the first British ambassador to Kuwait.

Heads of mission

Native Agent
1899–1904: Haji Ali bin Mulla Ghulam Bisa

Political Agent
1904–1909: Stuart Knox
1909–1914: William Shakespear
1914–1916: William Grey
1916–1918: Robert Hamilton
Mar–Sep 1918: Percy Loch (1887–1953)
1918–1920: Daniel McCollum 
1920–1929: James More
1929–1936: Harold Dickson
1936–1939: Gerald de Gaury
1939–1941: Arnold Galloway (1901–1988)
May–Aug 1941: Harold Dickson
1941–1943: Tom Hickinbotham (1903–1983)
1943–1944: Cornelius Pelly
1944–1945: Gordon Jackson 
1945–1946: Maurice Tandy (1912–1986) 
Mar–May 1946: Richard Bird
1946–1948: Maurice Tandy 
1947–1951: Herbert George Jakins
1951–1955: Cornelius Pelly
1955–1957: Gawain Bell
1957–1959: Aubrey Halford-MacLeod
1959–1961: John Richmond

Ambassador
1961–1963: Sir John Richmond
1963–1967: Noel Jackson
1967–1968: Geoffrey Arthur
1968–1970: Sir Sam Falle
1970–1974: Sir John Wilton
1974–1977: Sir Archie Lamb
1977–1982: Sydney Cambridge
1982–1985: Sir Ramsay Melhuish
1985–1987: Sir Peter Moon
1987–1990: Peter Hinchcliffe
1990–1992: Sir Michael Weston
1992–1996: William Fullerton
1996–1999: Sir Graham Boyce
1999–2002: Sir Richard Muir
2002–2005: Chris Wilton
2005–2008: Stuart Laing
2008–2010: Michael Aron
2010–2014: Frank Baker
2014–2017: Matthew Lodge
2017–2021: Michael Davenport

2021–: Belinda Lewis

References

HM political agents & ambassadors in Kuwait, British Embassy Kuwait via archive.org
Rich, Paul John, Creating the Arabian Gulf: The British Raj and the Invasions of the Gulf, Rowman & Littlefield, 2009, page 197

Kuwait
 
United Kingdom